Inside the World's Toughest Prisons is a television documentary series produced by London-based Emporium Productions and available on Netflix. The documentary shows life in 19 prisons around the world, mostly from the prisoner perspective but also including the perspective of prison guards and others interacting with the prison system. Season 1 was hosted by Irish journalist Paul Connolly and originally aired on Channel 5 (UK). Since the second season, the series has been commissioned by Netflix and hosted by UK journalist Raphael Rowe, who had himself served 12 years in prison for a crime he was eventually acquitted of. The series's sixth season was released on 28 September 2022.

Episodes 
<onlyinclude>

Season 1 (2016) 

Season 1, hosted by Paul Connolly, was aired in 2016 on Channel 5 in the United Kingdom. It is now available on Netflix along with Seasons 2, 3, 4 and 5.

Season 2 (2018) 

Season 2, produced by Netflix with host Raphael Rowe, was released on July 6, 2018 on Netflix.

Season 3 (2018) 

Season 3, produced by Netflix with host Raphael Rowe, was released on December 14, 2018 on Netflix.

Season 4 (2020) 

Season 4, produced by Netflix with host Raphael Rowe, was released on July 29, 2020 on Netflix.

Season 5 (2021) 
Season 5, produced by Netflix with host Raphael Rowe, was released on January 9, 2021 on Netflix.

Season 6 (2022) 
Season 6, produced by Netflix with host Raphael Rowe, was released on September 28, 2022 on Netflix.

References

External links 
 
 

Channel 5 (British TV channel) original programming
Netflix original documentary television series
2010s British documentary television series
2020s British documentary television series
2016 British television series debuts
English-language Netflix original programming
Works about prisons